Magik Muzik is a sub-label of Dutch label Black Hole Recordings that was founded by Tiësto in 2001.

History
In 1997 with the help of Arny Bink, co-founder of Black Hole Recordings, Tiësto was able to compile various styles of electronic music like trance, techno and house. Tiësto decided to create a sub-label, known as Magik Muzik. The label began releasing Tiësto’s own releases, but it has also released tracks for The Filterheadz, Oliver Lieb, Mark Norman, and Mojado. The label became a trademark which stands for high quality electronic dance music which was due to the release of Tiësto's classic dance anthem "Flight 643" in 2001.

Later on he included the work of other acclaimed artists like Jes Brieden and Phynn. Its first album release was a limited vinyl edition of Tiësto's first studio album In My Memory which is considered an LP, the special edition released in 2001 did not include the complete album which was released later that same year; The long play version has a catalog number of Magik Muzik 800 followed by the Magik Muzik 801 releases, known as "Flight 643" which is the labels pride and first release. "Gatex" by Umek is the first song which does not belong to Tiësto and was released through the record label Potential first, it was later remixed by Tiësto, DJ Montana, Oliver Lieb, and DJ Le Blanc and it was included in Magik Muzik's vinyl releases which by this time had gained success and support across Europe in 2002.

On October, 2004 the label released Tiësto Presents Magik Muzik which is a compilation of 10 previously released songs and singles which gained great success and was released through XMAG Magazine and DJ Magazine's issue 354 on November 28, 2003.

Magik Muzik also had a record store, known us "Magik Muzik The Store", but it closed down in 2006. In 2008, its parent company Black Hole Recordings was nominated at the WMC Awards in Miami, Florida for Best Global Dance Record Label. Much of Black Hole's success is due to its owner Tiësto who has released all his projects in it.

Artists

 7AHA & Gallen Rho
 Acaya
 Alex Kunnari
 Alex O'Rion
 Alex Seda
 Allure
 Amurai
 Andain
 Andy Duguid
 Andy Moor
 Antonio Moreno
 Au5
 Batdorf & Rodney
 Beat Service
 Beltek
 Betsie Larkin
 Blake Lewis
 Bobina
 BoomriSe
 BT
 Christian Falero
 Christina Novelli
 Daniel Wanrooy
 Danny Howard
 Dave Silcox 
 Dean Newton
 Dennis Sheperd
 Dinka
 DJ Cor Fijneman
 DJ Feel
 D.O.D.
 Driftmoon
 Emilio Fernandez
 Evil Twin
 Eximinds
 Fatum
 Ferry Tayle
 Filterheadz 
 First State
 Fox MacLeod
 Fred Baker
 G & A Project
 Game Chasers
 Garmiani 
 Glenn Morrison
 
 HAKA
 Heaven's Cry
 Hippocoon 
 Ido
 Inpetto
 J-Soul
 Jake Shanahan
 JES
 Johan Gielen
 Johnny Monsoon
 Jonas Steur
 Julie Thompson
 Kim Fai
 Lema
 LNG
 Loverush UK! 
 Mac & Mac
 Manufactured Superstars
 Mark Norman
 Mark Sherry
 MC Flipside
 Mell Tierra
 Menno De Jong
 Modifiers
 Mojado
 Mr. Sam
 Nerq
 Noah Neiman
 Oliver Lang
 Ollin Kan
 Patrick Hagenaar
 Patrick Plaice
 Paul Thomas
 Paul van Dyk
 Phoenyx
 Propylon
 PureNRG
 Quench
 Quivver	
 Richard Beynon
 Richard Durand
 Richard J. Dalton
 Richard Vission
 Roger Shah
 Salvatore Ganacci

 Sied van Riel
 Sir Llewy Project
 Save The Robot
 Scott Mac
 Sebastien Bruce
 Sephano & Torio 
 Shafer
 Simon Lee & Alvin
 Sisto 
 Solarstone
 Somna
 Steve Kaetzel 
 Steve Smooth 
 Stereojackers vs. Mark Loverush 
 Sunlounger
 Tamra Keenan	
 Tenishia
 The Ambush
 Thomas Mengel
 Tiësto
 Tom Cloud
 Torio
 Umek
 Vada
 Venice
 Victoria Aitken
 Whelan & Di Scala
 Yves-V
 Zen Freeman 
 Zero Point
 Zoo Brazil

Catalog

Albums

 Magik Muzik CD 01 Tiësto – In My Memory (CD, Album)
 Magik Muzik CD 02 Tiësto – In My Memory (2xCD, Album)
 Magik Muzik CD 03 Tiësto – Just Be (CD, Album)
 Magik Muzik CD 03RD Tiësto – Just Be: Remixed (CD, Album)
 Magik Muzik CD 04 Tiësto – Parade of the Athletes (CD, Album)
 Magik Muzik CD 05 Mojado – Arena (CD, Album)
 Magik Muzik CD 06 Mark Norman – Synchronicity (CD + CD, Album + Mixed)
 Magik Muzik CD 07 Tiësto – Elements of Life (CD, Album)
 Magik Muzik CD 08 JES – Disconnect (CD, Album)
 Magik Muzik CD 09 Mark Norman – Colours (CD, Album)
 Magik Muzik CD 10 Mojado – Skizo (CD, Album)
 Magik Muzik CD 11 JES – Into The Dawn (The Hits Disconnected) (CD, Album)
 Magik Muzik CD 12 Tiësto – Elements of Life: Remixed (CD, Album)
 Magik Muzik CD 13 Richard Durand – Always The Sun (CD, Album)
 Magik Muzik CD 14 Julie Thompson – Feeling For Corners (CD, Album)
 Magik Muzik CD 15 Zoo Brazil – Please Don't Panic (CD, Album)
 Magik Muzik CD 16 JES – Highglow (CD, Album)

 Magik Muzik CD 17 Tiësto –  Magikal Journey: The Hits Collection 1998–2008 (2xCD, Compilation)
 Magik Muzik CD 18 First State – Changing Lanes  (CD, Album)
 Magik Muzik CD 19 Richard Durand – Wide Awake (CD, Album)
 Magik Muzik CD 20 JES – Unleash The Beat (CD, Mixed)
 Magik Muzik CD 21 Allure – Kiss From The Past (CD, Album)
 Magik Muzik CD 22 Zoo Brazil – Songs For Clubs (CD, Mixed)
 Magik Muzik CD 23 First State – The Whole Nine Yards (2xCD, Mixed)
 Magik Muzik CD 24 Manufactured Superstars – Freak On You EP (CD, EP)
 Magik Muzik CD 25 Zoo Brazil – Any Moment Now (CD, Album)
 Magik Muzik CD 26 Richard Durand – Richard Durand Versus The World (CD, Album)
 Magik Muzik CD 27 Allure – Kiss From The Past (The Remix Album) (CD, Album)
 Magik Muzik CD 28 First State – The Whole Nine Yards 2 (Jakarta – Amsterdam) (2xCD, Mixed)
 Magik Muzik CD 29 Bobina – Same Difference (CD, Album)
 Magik Muzik CD 30 Emilio Fernandez – Suite 16 (CD, Album)
 Magik Muzik CD 31 JES – Unleash The Beat 2 (2xCD, Mixed)
 Magik Muzik CD 32 Andy Duguid – On The Edge (CD, Album)
 Magik Muzik CD 33 Zoo Brazil – Songs For Clubs 2 (CD, Mixed)

Vinyl
This list contains the vinyl released in Magik Muzik.

 Magik Muzik 800 Tiësto – In My Memory (Limited vinyl edition)
 Magik Muzik 801 Tiësto – Flight 643
 Magik Muzik 802 Tiësto – Suburban Train
 Magik Muzik 803 Tiësto – Urban Train
 Magik Muzik 804 Tiësto – Lethal Industry
 Magik Muzik 805 Tiësto – In My Memory
 Magik Muzik 806 Tiësto – 643 (Love's on Fire)
 Magik Muzik 807 Umek – Gatex
 Magik Muzik 808 Tiësto & Junkie XL – Obsession
 Magik Muzik 809 Mr. Sam vs. Fred Baker Present As One – Forever Waiting
 Magik Muzik 810 Filterheadz Present Orange 3 – In Your Eyes
 Magik Muzik 811 Mark Norman – Stream
 Magik Muzik 812 The Ambush – Acapulco
 Magik Muzik 813 Fred Baker – My Thing
 Magik Muzik 814 Tiësto – Traffic
 Magik Muzik 815 Mojado – Naranja
 Magik Muzik 816 Mark Norman – Phantom Manor / Rush
 Magik Muzik 817 Tiësto – Love Comes Again
 Magik Muzik 818 Mojado – El Toro
 Magik Muzik 819 Estuera – Tales From The South
 Magik Muzik 820 Tiësto – Just Be
 Magik Muzik 821 Tiësto – Just Be (Wally Lopez Remixes)
 Magik Muzik 822 Mojado – Señorita
 Magik Muzik 823 Tiësto – Adagio For Strings
 Magik Muzik 824 Tiësto – Adagio For Strings
 Magik Muzik 825 Mojado – El Matador
 Magik Muzik 826 Tiësto – UR/A Tear in the Open
 Magik Muzik 827 Mark Norman – Touch Down / False Vegas
 Magik Muzik 828 Allure – The Loves We Lost
 Magik Muzik 829 Solarstone & JES – Like A Waterfall
 Magik Muzik 830 Mojado – Arena
 Magik Muzik 831 Mark Norman – Brasília
 Magik Muzik 832 Progression – Technophobia / Loving Memories
 Magik Muzik 833 Tiësto – Dance4Life
 Magik Muzik 834 Tiësto – Dance4Life (Fonzerelli & Global Experience Remixes)
 Magik Muzik 835 Tiësto – Lethal Industry / Flight 643 (Richard Durand Remixes)
 Magik Muzik 836 JES – Ghost
 Magik Muzik 837 Tiësto – In The Dark
 Magik Muzik 838 Mark Norman – Ventura
 Magik Muzik 839 Mojado – Skizo Limited 1/4
 Magik Muzik 840 Mojado – Skizo Limited 2/4
 Magik Muzik 841 Mojado – Skizo Limited 3/4
 Magik Muzik 842 Mojado – Skizo Limited 4/4
 Magik Muzik 843 Mark Norman – Niagara
 Magik Muzik 844 JES – Ghost (The Remixes)
 Magik Muzik 845 Tiësto – Break My Fall
 Magik Muzik 846 Tiësto – Break My Fall (Remixes)
 Magik Muzik 847 Mark Norman – Blikken Machine
 Magik Muzik 848 JES – Heaven
 Magik Muzik 849 Allure – Somewhere Inside
 Magik Muzik 850 Solarstone & JES – Like A Waterfall (Gift & Kostas K Remixes)
 Magik Muzik 851 JES – People Will Go (Steve Forte Rio Remix)
 Magik Muzik 852 Mark Norman – Be With U
 Magik Muzik 853 Mojado – Free Your Mind
 Magik Muzik 854
 Magik Muzik 855 Mark Norman – Phantom Manor
 Magik Muzik 856 Mark Norman – Bazarus
 Magik Muzik 857 JES – Imagination
 Magik Muzik 858 Mark Norman – Restart
 Magik Muzik 859 Allure – Power of You
 Magik Muzik 860 Mojado – Too High
 Magik Muzik 861 Patrick Plaice & Frank Ellrich – Sticky Tape
 Magik Muzik 862 Richard Durand – Into Something
 Magik Muzik 863 Mark Norman vs. Hole In One – Life's Too Short (2009)
 Magik Muzik 864 Richard Durand – Always The Sun
 Magik Muzik 865 Patrick Plaice – Falling Out
 Magik Muzik 866 Mark Norman – Coffee Break
 Magik Muzik 867
 Magik Muzik 868 Mac & Mac – Solid Session
 Magik Muzik 869 Julie Thompson – It Only Hurts
 Magik Muzik 870 Richard Durand – No Way Home
 Magik Muzik 871 Fred Baker – Ibiza Project 2009
 Magik Muzik 872 First State – Brave
 Magik Muzik 873 Mark Norman – Confuse
 Magik Muzik 874 Scott Mac – Damager 02
 Magik Muzik 875 Patrick Plaice – Flash Forward
 Magik Muzik 876 Johan Gielen – Repeat The Music
 Magik Muzik 877 Richard Durand – Silver Key
 Magik Muzik 878 Julie Thompson – What Will I Do
 Magik Muzik 879 First State – Brave (Second Mix)
 Magik Muzik 880 JES – Lovesong
 Magik Muzik 881 JES – Chanson D'Amour
 Magik Muzik 882 Zoo Brazil – You Can Have It All
 Magik Muzik 883 Richard Durand – Xelerate
 Magik Muzik 884 Alex Kunnari & Heikki L – Rising
 Magik Muzik 885 Johan Gielen – These Are My People
 Magik Muzik 886 Tiësto – Goldrush
 Magik Muzik 887 Tiësto – Magikal Circus
 Magik Muzik 888 Mark Norman – Fobiac
 Magik Muzik 889 Beat Service – Hiding To Nothing
 Magik Muzik 890 Fred Baker pres. Saona – Saona
 Magik Muzik 891 Richard Durand – Tiger's Apology
 Magik Muzik 892 First State – Cape Point
 Magik Muzik 893 Johan Gielen – I'm Lonely
 Magik Muzik 894 Whelan & Di Scala – Achilles
 Magik Muzik 895 First State – As You Were
 Magik Muzik 896 JES – Closer
 Magik Muzik 897 Alex Kunnari & Heikki L – Brand New Day
 Magik Muzik 898 Mark Norman – Actual Events
 Magik Muzik 899 Julie Thompson – Shine
 Magik Muzik 900 Zero Point – Kineticut
 Magik Muzik 901 Richard Durand – Night & Day
 Magik Muzik 902 Johan Gielen – I'm Lonely (Marc Lime & K. Bastian Remix)
 Magik Muzik 903 Zoo Brazil – There Is Hope
 Magik Muzik 904 Fred Baker pres. Saona – I Miss U
 Magik Muzik 905 First State – Cross The Line
 Magik Muzik 906 J-Soul – Follow Changes
 Magik Muzik 907 Julie Thompson – Shine (Kid Massive 3AM Mix)
 Magik Muzik 908 JES – Awaken
 Magik Muzik 909 Johan Gielen – Jonko
 Magik Muzik 910 Richard Durand – Dryland
 Magik Muzik 911 JES – Awaken (Remixes)
 Magik Muzik 912 First State – Reverie
 Magik Muzik 913 Johan Gielen – I'm Lonely (Eric van Kleef Remixes)
 Magik Muzik 914 Richard Durand – Wide Awake
 Magik Muzik 915 Yves V vs. Fred Baker – Start Again / Phase 1
 Magik Muzik 916 Glenn Morrison – Tokyo Cries
 Magik Muzik 917 JES – Despierta
 Magik Muzik 918 Richard Durand – Robotic / Real Deal
 Magik Muzik 919 Dean Newton – Phazin
 Magik Muzik 920 LNG – Harmony Will Kick You In The Ass
 Magik Muzik 921 Richard Durand feat. Ellie Lawson – Wide Awake
 Magik Muzik 922 Manufactured Superstars – Angry Circus / Drummer Drums
 Magik Muzik 923 Richard Durand – Explode
 Magik Muzik 924 First State – Skies On Fire
 Magik Muzik 925 Manufactured Superstars – Take Me Over
 Magik Muzik 926 Allure – Show Me The Way
 Magik Muzik 927 Alex Kunnari – Lost
 Magik Muzik 928 Save The Robot  – Compassion
 Magik Muzik 929 Amurai – Killing Me Inside
 Magik Muzik 930 Fred Baker – Never Let Me Go
 Magik Muzik 931 LNG – Hoover Damn
 Magik Muzik 932 Manufactured Superstars – Serious
 Magik Muzik 933 Manufactured Superstars – Serious (Remixes)

 Magik Muzik 934 J-Soul feat. Rave Channel – Deeper
 Magik Muzik 935 JES – It's Too Late
 Magik Muzik 936 Blake Lewis – Till We See The Sun
 Magik Muzik 937 Allure feat. Christian Burns – On The Wire
 Magik Muzik 938
 Magik Muzik 939 Alex Kunnari – You And Me
 Magik Muzik 940 Fox MacLeod – Zinc
 Magik Muzik 941 Andy Duguid feat. Fenja – Strings
 Magik Muzik 942 First State feat. Tyler Sherritt – Maze
 Magik Muzik 943 Alex Kunnari – Music
 Magik Muzik 944 JES & Ronski Speed – Can't Stop
 Magik Muzik 945
 Magik Muzik 946 Manufactured Superstars – Drunk Text
 Magik Muzik 947 Manufactured Superstars – Drunk Text (Remixes)
 Magik Muzik 948 JES – It's Too Late
 Magik Muzik 949 Tiësto – Love Comes Again / Flight 643 / Traffic
 Magik Muzik 950 Mark Norman – Rebound
 Magik Muzik 951 First State feat. Tyler Sherritt – Maze (Remixes)
 Magik Muzik 952 Zoo Brazil feat. Rasmus Kellerman – There Is Hope
 Magik Muzik 953 Alex Kunnari feat. Ben Andreas – Taste The Sun
 Magik Muzik 954 JES – Ghost (TyDi Remix)
 Magik Muzik 955 Richard Durand – Richard Durand vs. The World EP 1: Asia / Australia
 Magik Muzik 956 Manufactured Superstars & Jeziel Quintela feat. Christian Burns – Silver Splits The Blue
 Magik Muzik 957 Allure – I Am
 Magik Muzik 958 JES & Andy Duguid – Before You Go
 Magik Muzik 959 Julie Thompson & Leon Bolier – Underwater
 Magik Muzik 960 Tiësto – Lethal Industry (Sebastien Bruce Remix)
 Magik Muzik 961 Bobina – Diamond Hell
 Magik Muzik 962 Dave Silcox feat. Amy Pearson – This Is Love
 Magik Muzik 963 Vada – Mainline
 Magik Muzik 964 Alex Kunnari – Colors
 Magik Muzik 965 Patrick Hagenaar – Bangers N Mash / Undutchable
 Magik Muzik 966 Allure feat. Emma Hewitt – Stay Forever
 Magik Muzik 967 Victoria Aitken – Weekend Lover
 Magik Muzik 968 Phoenyx & Kunala – Feel
 Magik Muzik 969 Richard Durand – Trancefusion
 Magik Muzik 970 Richard Durand – Richard Durand vs. The World EP 2: Europe
 Magik Muzik 971 Bobina – Diamond Hell (Remixes)
 Magik Muzik 972 Andy Duguid feat. Shannon Hurley – I Want To Believe
 Magik Muzik 973 Bobina – Quattro 372
 Magik Muzik 974 Danny Howard – Adagio For Strings / Follow
 Magik Muzik 975 D.O.D – Hands / Smash Tash
 Magik Muzik 976 Manufactured Superstars & LA Riots feat. Selina Albright – Born To Rock
 Magik Muzik 977 Quivver feat. Lea Luna – Arrest The DJ
 Magik Muzik 978 Julie Thompson & MaRLo – Broken Wing
 Magik Muzik 979 Richard Durand – Richard Durand vs. The World – North America
 Magik Muzik 980 Oliver Lang – Coastline
 Magik Muzik 981 Andy Duguid feat. Lizzie Curious – Music Box
 Magik Muzik 982 Bobina – Quattro 372 (Remixes)
 Magik Muzik 983 Paul Thomas feat. Ladystation – Motivation
 Magik Muzik 984 Mark Norman – Phantom Manor (Remixes)
 Magik Muzik 985 Allure feat. Jeza – You Say It'll Be Okay
 Magik Muzik 986 Quivver feat. Lea Luna – Arrest The DJ (Remixes)
 Magik Muzik 987 Sir Llewy Project – Weekend Awaits Me
 Magik Muzik 988 Beltek – Go!
 Magik Muzik 989 Bobina – The Space Track
 Magik Muzik 990 Manufactured Superstars feat. Arianny Celeste – Top Of The World
 Magik Muzik 991 Richard Durand – Richard Durand vs. The World – Africa & Middle East
 Magik Muzik 992 Bobina feat. Betsie Larkin – No Substitute For You
 Magik Muzik 993 First State feat. Max'C – Holding On
 Magik Muzik 994 Steve Smooth & Tony Arzadon feat. Tamra Keenan – All You And I
 Magik Muzik 995 Manufactured Superstars feat. Arianny Celeste – Top Of The World (Remixes)
 Magik Muzik 996 Alex Kunnari feat. Jon Hall – Sweet Melody
 Magik Muzik 997 Mark Norman vs. Hole In One – Life's Too Short 2009 (Alexx Rave Remix)
 Magik Muzik 998 MC Flipside – Draganno vs. Zero
 Magik Muzik 999 Bobina – The Space Track (Andrew Rayel Remix)
 Magik Muzik 1000 First State & Jake Shanahan – Why So Serious
 Magik Muzik 1001 Richard Durand & Pedro Del Mar feat. Roberta Harrison – Paint The Sky
 Magik Muzik 1002 Alex O'Rion – Tornado
 Magik Muzik 1003 Richard Durand – Richard Durand vs. The World – South America
 Magik Muzik 1004 Andy Duguid & Julie Thompson – Skin & Bones
 Magik Muzik 1005
 Magik Muzik 1006
 Magik Muzik 1007 Paul Thomas feat. Ladystation – Motivation (Remixes)
 Magik Muzik 1008 Tiësto – Lethal Industry (Sterbinszky & Coddie Remix)
 Magik Muzik 1009 Alex O'Rion – The Friendly Giant
 Magik Muzik 1010 D.O.D – Generation / Let's Rock
 Magik Muzik 1011
 Magik Muzik 1012 Steve Smooth, Sephano & Torio feat. Jenny G – This Is The Night
 Magik Muzik 1013 Tiësto – Love Comes Again (Remixes)
 Magik Muzik 1014 Mell Tierra feat. Maegan Cottone – The Greatest
 Magik Muzik 1015 Garmiani & Salvatore Ganacci – The City Is Mine
 Magik Muzik 1016 Zoo Brazil feat. Ursula Rucker – Give Myself
 Magik Muzik 1017 Steve Kaetzel & Johnny Monsoon feat. Emma Lock – Winter
 Magik Muzik 1018 MC Flipside – Draganno (Remixes)
 Magik Muzik 1019 Manufactured Superstars – Zombies In Love
 Magik Muzik 1020 JES – Unleash The Beat (Remixes)
 Magik Muzik 1021 Richard Durand – Destination Prague
 Magik Muzik 1022 Bobina feat. Betsie Larkin – No Substitute For You (Remixes)
 Magik Muzik 1023 Ido – Fully Charged EP
 Magik Muzik 1024 First State feat. Sarah Howells – Seeing Stars
 Magik Muzik 1025 Steve Smooth, Sephano & Torio feat. Jenny G – This Is The Night (Tony Arzadon Remix)
 Magik Muzik 1026 Allure feat. Emma Hewitt – No Goodbyes
 Magik Muzik 1027 Alex O'Rion – Sunchaser
 Magik Muzik 1028 Bobina feat. Mariske Hekkenberg – Slow MMXIII
 Magik Muzik 1029 Richard Beynon & Zen Freeman feat. CeCe Peniston – All My Love
 Magik Muzik 1030 Christian Falero & Alex Seda – Smile
 Magik Muzik 1031 Kim Fai – The Eagle Has Landed
 Magik Muzik 1032 Emilio Fernandez feat. Jones – Closer To Me
 Magik Muzik 1033
 Magik Muzik 1034 Fred Baker – A New Life On Earth
 Magik Muzik 1035 Emilio Fernandez feat. Jones – Closer To Me (Remixes)
 Magik Muzik 1036 Tamra Keenan – Pontius Pilate
 Magik Muzik 1037
 Magik Muzik 1038 First State feat. Sarah Howells – Seeing Stars (Remixes)
 Magik Muzik 1039 First State – Humanoid
 Magik Muzik 1040 Richard Durand – Radical
 Magik Muzik 1041 Richard Durand – Trancematic
 Magik Muzik 1042 Mell Tierra – Get Down
 Magik Muzik 1043 Richard Durand – L.A. ROCK!
 Magik Muzik 1044 Emilio Fernandez with DJ Feel – Diggin' This Feeling
 Magik Muzik 1045 Bobina – Basque The Dog
 Magik Muzik 1046 Save The Robot – Kai Zen
 Magik Muzik 1047 Garmiani & Salvatore Ganacci – The City Is Mine (Remixes)
 Magik Muzik 1048 Tiësto – Adagio For Strings (Blasterjaxx Remix)
 Magik Muzik 1049 Julie Thompson & Super8 & Tab – Your Secret's Safe
 Magik Muzik 1050 Roger Shah & Brian Laruso feat. JES – Higher Than The Sun
 Magik Muzik 1051 Bobina – Basque The Dog (Remixes)
 Magik Muzik 1052 Kim Fai & Dom Kane – Moon
 Magik Muzik 1053 Loverush UK feat. Bryan Adams – Tonight In Babylon 2013
 Magik Muzik 1054 Alex O'Rion – Don't Look Back
 Magik Muzik 1055 Save The Robot – Ready 4 Love
 Magik Muzik 1056
 Magik Muzik 1057 EC Twins & Nejat Barton feat. Lea Luna – Hot Summer Nights
 Magik Muzik 1058
 Magik Muzik 1059
 Magik Muzik 1060 Patrick Hagenaar feat. Sarah McLeod – Magik
 Magik Muzik 1059 First State feat. Fenja – Battle Of Hearts

This list contains the vinyl released in Magik Muzik UK.
 MMUK001 Umek – Gatex
 MMUK002 Mr. Sam vs. Fred Baker Present As One – Forever Waiting
 MMUK003 Filterheadz Present Orange 3 – In Your Eyes
 MMUK004 Mark Norman – Stream
 MMUK005 Fred Baker – My Thing

Long Plays
 Magik Muzik LP 03 Tiësto – Just Be (4xLP, Ltd, Album, Col)
 Magik Muzik LP 04 Tiësto – Parade of the Athletes (4xLP, Ltd, Album, Whi) 
 Magik Muzik LP 05 Mojado – Arena (4xLP, Ltd, Album, Red) 
 Magik Muzik LP 06 Mark Norman – Synchronicity (4xLP, Ltd, Album, Blu) 
 Magik Muzik LP 07 Tiësto – Elements of Life (4xLP, Ltd, Album) 
 Magik Muzik LP 12 Tiësto – Elements of Life: Remixed (2xLP, Album)

See also
List of electronic music record labels

References

Dutch record labels
Trance record labels
Record labels established in 2001
Electronic music record labels
Electronic dance music record labels